Javier del Valle Liendo (born April 2, 1988 in Córdoba, Argentina)  is an Argentine footballer. He currently plays as a midfielder for Deportivo Táchira.

Liendo represented Argentina at under-17 level in 2005.

External links
 
 

1988 births
Living people
Argentine footballers
Argentine expatriate footballers
Footballers from Córdoba, Argentina
Club Atlético Belgrano footballers
Ciudad de Murcia footballers
Boavista F.C. players
Club Nacional de Football players
C.A. Bella Vista players
Sportivo Luqueño players
2 de Mayo footballers
Carabobo F.C. players
Racing de Córdoba footballers
General Paz Juniors footballers
Gimnasia y Tiro footballers
Club Atlético Mitre footballers
Alumni de Villa María players
Club Atlético Las Palmas players
Municipal Pérez Zeledón footballers
Instituto footballers
Deportivo Táchira F.C. players
Torneo Argentino A players
Torneo Argentino B players
Primera Nacional players
Liga FPD players
Venezuelan Primera División players
Association football midfielders
Argentine expatriate sportspeople in Spain
Argentine expatriate sportspeople in Portugal
Argentine expatriate sportspeople in Uruguay
Argentine expatriate sportspeople in Paraguay
Argentine expatriate sportspeople in Venezuela
Argentine expatriate sportspeople in Costa Rica
Expatriate footballers in Spain
Expatriate footballers in Portugal
Expatriate footballers in Uruguay
Expatriate footballers in Paraguay
Expatriate footballers in Venezuela
Expatriate footballers in Costa Rica